The 2010 Toronto Nationals season was the second for the franchise.  After playing their 2009 season at BMO Field, the Nationals moved their home games to Lamport Stadium for their second season.  Coming off a Steinfeld Cup victory in 2009, the Nationals were unable to repeat this achievement.  They finished last in the league in 2010 and failed to qualify for the playoffs with a 3-9 record.  Brodie Merrill won the Major League Lacrosse Defensive player of the Year Award and was named to the All-MLL team as a defenseman.

Standings 
W = Wins, L = Losses, PCT = Winning Percentage, GB = Games Back of first place, GF = Goals For, 2ptGF = 2 point Goals For, GA = Goals Against, 2ptGA = 2 point Goals Against

Boston finished ahead of Denver based on a head to head record of 3-0.

Schedule

Playoffs

The Nationals did not qualify for the 2010 Steinfeld Cup playoffs after winning the championship in 2009.

References

External links

Toronto Nationals Season, 2010
Hamilton Nationals seasons
2010 in Canadian sports
2010 in Toronto